Joint Base San Antonio (JBSA) is a United States military facility located in San Antonio, Texas, US. The facility is under the jurisdiction of the United States Air Force 502d Air Base Wing, Air Education and Training Command (AETC). The wing's three Mission Support Groups perform the installation support mission at the three bases that form JBSA.

The facility is a Joint Base of the United States Army Fort Sam Houston, the United States Air Force Randolph Air Force Base, Lackland Air Force Base and Martindale Army Airfield, which were merged on 1 October 2010.

Overview
JBSA was established in accordance with congressional legislation implementing the recommendations of the 2005 Base Realignment and Closure Commission.  The legislation ordered the consolidation of the three facilities which were nearby, but separate military installations, into a single joint base, one of 12 formed in the United States as a result of the law.

Joint Base San Antonio supports a population of 80,000 and supports students at three installations annually of up to 138,000. Upon becoming the largest single DoD installation/enterprise, it has a total Plant Replacement Value of about 10.3 billion, lead a work force of over 8,000 personnel, manages an annual budget of 800 million, interface with 1,000 civic leaders of San Antonio, 20 smaller communities, four counties and four Congressional Districts, support more than 266 mission partners, supported and supporting units, and finally, support more than 250,000 other personnel including 425 retired general officers (2nd largest concentration in U.S.).

Tenant Bases
Fort Sam Houston (US Army)
Randolph Air Force Base (US Air Force)
Lackland Air Force Base (including Kelly Field and Chapman Training Annex) (US Air Force)
Camp Bullis (US Army)
 Seguin Auxiliary Air Field (US Air Force)

Related Military Reservations
Camp Stanley (US Army)

Fort Sam Houston

The primary mission at Fort Sam Houston is as a medical training and support post. The post is the home of Army North, Army South, Army 5th Recruiting Brigade, Brooke Army Medical Center, the Institute of Surgical Research, US Army Medical Center of Excellence, the Army Medical Command and the 502d Air Base Wing.

Fort Sam Houston provides facilities to and support for the activities of garrison units and other tenant organizations. The post also supports the thousands of Army Reserve and National Guard soldiers who train there year round. Soldiers from Fort Sam Houston have participated in every American War since 1845 and have deployed worldwide in support of post-Cold War contingency operations.

Together with Camp Stanley (Camp Stanley is not part of JBSA), Camp Bullis is part of the Leon Springs Military Reservation. Camp Bullis has provided firing ranges, training areas and logistics support to Fort Sam Houston and other active and reserve component units in South Texas for nearly 100 years. Its most frequent users are the Army Medical Center of Excellence, Defense Medical Readiness Training Institute, Air Force Ground Combat Skills School and Army units stationed at Fort Sam Houston. There are currently 130 military personnel stationed at Bullis.

Lackland Air Force Base

Lackland Air Force Base is home to more than 120 Department of Defense and associate organizations, including the 37th Training Wing, the largest training wing in the U.S. Air Force.  Lackland is the Air Force's only site for enlisted basic military training, and also offers professional and technical skills, and English language training for members of the U.S. Air Force, other military services, government agencies, and allies. Its four primary training functions graduate more than 86,000 students annually.

Other major tenants include Air Reserve Command's 433d Airlift Wing, the Texas Air National Guard 149th Fighter Wing, the 59th Medical Wing, the Sixteenth Air Force, and the 67th Cyberspace Wing.

Randolph Air Force Base

Randolph is named after Captain William Millican Randolph, a native of Austin, who was on the base naming committee at the time of his death in a crash. It serves as headquarters of the Air Education and Training Command (AETC) as well as the Air Force Personnel Center (AFPC) and is known as "the Showplace of the Air Force" because of the Spanish Colonial Revival Style architecture in which all structures including hangars were constructed. The symbol of the base is a large water tower atop Building 100, housing the headquarters for Randolph's major flying unit, the 12th Flying Training Wing (12 FTW).  With its distinctive architecture, the wing's headquarters has come to be known throughout the Air Force as "the Taj Mahal," or simply "The Taj".

Randolph Air Force Base is home to more than 30 Department of Defense units including Headquarters Air Education and Training Command, Air Force Personnel Center, Air Force Recruiting Service, and the 12th Flying Training Wing.

Based units 
Flying and notable non-flying units based at JBSA.

Units marked GSU are Geographically Separate Units, which although based at JBSA, are subordinate to a parent unit based at another location. Some units may be entirely garrisoned at JBSA, but be spread out across different sites.

United States Air Force 

Air Education and Training Command (AETC)
 Headquarters Air Education and Training Command (JBSA-Randolph)
 502nd Air Base Wing (All Locations of JBSA)
 Headquarters 502nd Air Base Wing
 502nd Contracting Squadron
 502nd Comptroller Squadron
 US Air Force Band of the West
 502nd Force Support Group
 502nd Force Support Squadron
 802nd Force Support Squadron
 502nd Installation Support Group
 502nd Civil Engineer Squadron
 502nd Communications Squadron
 502nd Operations Support Squadron
 502nd Security Forces and Logistics Support Group
 502nd Security Forces Squadron
 802nd Security Forces Squadron
 902nd Security Forces Squadron
 502nd Logistics Readiness Squadron
 502nd Trainer Development Squadron
 59th Medical Wing
 Headquarters 59th Medical Wing (JBSA-Lackland)
 59th Medical Operations Group (JBSA-Lackland)
 59th Medical Operations Squadron
 59th Surgical Operations Squadron
 59th Mental Health Squadron
 59th Radiology Squadron
 59th Surgical Specialty Squadron
 59th Diagnosis and Therapeutics Squadron
 59th Laboratory Squadron
 59th Pharmacy Squadron
 59th Medical Support Group (JBSA-Lackland)
 59th Medical Support Squadron
 59th Medical Logistics and Readiness Squadron
 59th Dental Group (JBSA-Lackland)
 59th Dental Squadron
 59th Dental Support Squadron
 59th Dental Training Squadron
 559th Medical Group (JBSA-Lackland)
 559th Aerospace Medicine Squadron
 559th Medical Operations Squadron
 359th Medical Group (JBSA-Randolph)
 359th Dental Squadron
 359th Medical Operations Squadron
 359th Aerospace Medicine Squadron
 359th Medical Operations Squadron
 359th Medical Support Squadron
 959th Medical Group (JBSA-Fort Sam Houston)
 959th Medical Operations Squadron
 959th Inpatient Operations Squadron
 959th Clinical Support Squadron
 59th Training Group (JBSA-Fort Sam Houston)
 381st Training Squadron
 382nd Training Squadron
 383rd Training Squadron
 59th Training Support Squadron
 2nd Air Force
 37th Training Wing (JBSA-Lackland)
 37th Training Wing Staff Agencies
 37th Training Group
 37th Training Support Squadron
 341st Training Squadron
 343rd Training Squadron
 344th Training Squadron
 345th Training Squadron
 737th Training Group
 319th Training Squadron
 320th Training Squadron
 321st Training Squadron
 322nd Training Squadron
 323rd Training Squadron
 324th Training Squadron
 326th Training Squadron
 331st Training Squadron
 737th Training Support Squadron
 Defense Language Institute English Language Center
 332nd Training Squadron
 637th International Support Squadron
 637th Training Support Squadron
 Inter-American Air Forces Academy
 318th Training Squadron
 837th Training Squadron
 Special Warfare Training Wing (JBSA-Lackland)
 19th Air Force 
 Headquarters 19th Air Force (JBSA-Lackland)
 12th Flying Training Wing (JBSA-Randolph)
 12th Operations Group
 12th Operations Support Squadron
 12th Training Squadron
 99th Flying Training Squadron - Raytheon T-1A Jayhawk
 435th Fighter Training Squadron - Northrop T-38C Talon
 558th Flying Training Squadron - Remotely Piloted Aircraft Fundamentals
 559th Flying Training Squadron - Beechcraft T-6A Texan II
 560th Flying Training Squadron - Northrop T-38C Talon
 12th Maintenance Group
 Air Force Recruiting Service
 Headquarters Air Force Recruiting Service (JBSA-Randolph)
 369th Recruiting Group (JBSA-Lackland)

Air Combat Command (ACC)
 16th Air Force
 Headquarters 16th Air Force (JBSA-Lackland)
 616th Operations Center (JBSA-Lackland)
 616th Air Communications Squadron
 67th Cyberspace Wing (JBSA-Lackland)
 Headquarters 67th Cyberspace Wing
 67th Operations Support Squadron
 67th Cyberspace Operations Group
 91st Cyberspace Operations Squadron
 375th Cyberspace Operations Squadron
 390th Cyberspace Operations Squadron
 318th Cyberspace Operations Group
 318th Range Squadron
 346th Test Squadron
 567th Cyberspace Operations Group
 92nd Cyberspace Operations Squadron
 834th Cyberspace Operations Squadron
 867th Cyberspace Operations Group
 833rd Cyberspace Operations Squadron
 836th Cyberspace Operations Squadron
 688th Cyberspace Wing
 Headquarters 688th Cyberspace Wing (JBSA-Lackland)
 688th Operations Support Squadron
 26th Cyberspace Operations Group
 33rd Network Warfare Squadron
 68th Network Warfare Squadron
 690th Cyberspace Operations Group
 690th Intelligence Support Squadron
 690th Network Support Squadron
 350th Spectrum Warfare Wing
 850th Spectrum Warfare Group
 Detachment 1 (GSU) (JBSA-Lackland) 
 453rd Electronic Warfare Squadron (GSU) (JBSA-Lackland) 

Air Force Materiel Command (AFMC)
 Air Force Installation and Mission Support Center (JBSA-Lackland)
 Expeditionary Support and Innovation Directorate
 Strategy and Innovation Division
 Expeditionary Support Division
 Installation Support Directorate
 Installation Engineering Division
 Protection Services Division
 Cyber Support Division
 Chaplain Corps Division
 Installation Deployment Division
 Airman & Family Services Division
 Mission Activity Integration Division
 Resources Directorate
 Resource Management Analysis Division
 Cost & Comparative Analysis Division
 Financial Operations Division
 Integration Division
 Planning and Programming Division
 Air Force Civil Engineer Center
 Air Force Security Forces Center
 Air Force Services Center
 AFIMSC Detachment 7 (JBSA-Randolph)
 Air Force Life Cycle Management Center
 Command, Control Communications, Intelligence & Networks Directorate
 Cryptologic and Cyber Systems Division (GSU) (JBSA-Lackland)

Air Force Office of Special Investigations (AFOSI)
 Headquarters Air Force Office of Special Investigations
 Operating Location Whiskey (JBSA-Lackland)
 4th Field Investigation Region
 4th Field Investigation Region Headquarters (JBSA-Randolph)
 11th Field Investigation Squadron (All JBSA Locations)

Air Force Field Operating Agencies
 Air Force Personnel Center (JBSA-Randolph)
 Air Force Manpower Analysis Agency (JBSA-Randolph)
 Air Force Public Affairs Agency (JBSA-Randolph)

Air Force Reserve Command (AFRC)
 22nd Air Force
 413th Flight Test Group
 415th Flight Test Flight (GSU) (JBSA-Randolph)
 340th Flying Training Group (JBSA-Randolph)
 39th Flying Training Squadron - Northrop T-38C Talon, Raytheon T-1A Jayhawk, & Beechcraft T-6A Texan II
 433rd Training Squadron (JBSA-Lackland)
 10th Air Force
 960th Cyberspace Wing (JBSA-Lackland)
 Headquarters 960th Cyberspace Wing
 960th Cyberspace Operations Group
 426th Network Warfare Squadron
 50th Network Warfare Squadron
 854th Combat Operations Squadron
 960th Operations Support Flight
 655th Intelligence, Surveillance and Reconnaissance Wing
 655th Intelligence, Surveillance and Reconnaissance Group
 23rd Intelligence Squadron (GSU) (JBSA-Lackland)
 4th Air Force
 433rd Airlift Wing (JBSA-Lackland)
 Headquarters 433rd Airlift Wing
 433rd Operations Group
 68th Airlift Squadron - Lockheed C-5M Galaxy
 356th Airlift Squadron - Lockheed C-5M Galaxy
 433rd Aeromedical Evacuation Squadron
 733rd Training Squadron
 433rd Contingency Response Flight
 433rd Operations Support Squadron
 433rd Maintenance Group
 433rd Maintenance Squadron
 433rd Aircraft Maintenance Squadron
 433rd Mission Support Group
 26th Aerial Port Squadron
 74th Aerial Port Squadron
 433rd Force Support Squadron
 433rd Civil Engineer Squadron
 433rd Security Forces Squadron
 433rd Logistics Readiness Squadron
 433rd Medical Group
 433rd Aeromedical Staging Squadron
 433rd Aerospace Medicine Squadron
 433rd Medical Squadron

Air National Guard (ANG)
 Texas Air National Guard
 149th Fighter Wing (JBSA-Lackland)
 Headquarters 149th Fighter Wing
 149th Medical Group
 149th Operations Group
 182nd Fighter Squadron - General Dynamics F-16C Fighting Falcon
 149th Maintenance Group
 149th Aircraft Maintenance Squadron
 149th Maintenance Squadron
 149th Mission Support Group
 149th Civil Engineer Squadron
 149th Communications Flight
 149th Mission Support Flight
 149th Security Forces Squadron
 149th Logistics Readiness Squadron

United States Army 

United States Army Medical Command (MEDCOM)
 Headquarters US Army Medical Command (JBSA-Fort Sam Houston)
 Brooke Army Medical Center (JBSA-Fort Sam Houston)
 Regional Health Command - Central (JBSA-Fort Sam Houston)
 Medical Research and Material Command
 US Army Institute of Surgical Research (GSU) (JBSA-Fort Sam Houston)
United States Army Medical Department (AMEDD)
 US Army Medical Center of Excellence (MEDCoE)
 32nd Medical Brigade (JBSA-Fort Sam Houston)
 Headquarters 32nd Medical Brigade
 187th Medical Battalion
 188th Medical Battalion
 232nd Medical Battalion
 264th Medical Battalion
 United States Army Veterinary Corps (JBSA-Fort Sam Houston)
 Headquarters US Army Veterinary Corps
 United States Army Medical Test and Evaluation Activity (USAMTEAC) (JBSA-Fort Sam Houston)
 Headquarters US Army Medical Test and Evaluation Activity
 Information Management/Information Technology Test and Evaluation Branch

United States Army Materiel Command (AMC)
 United States Army Installation Management Command (IMCOM) 
 Headquarters US Army Installation Management Command (JBSA-Fort Sam Houston)
 Army Support Activity - JBSA
 Fort Sam Houston Mission Training Complex (JBSA-Camp Bullis)
 United States Army Contracting Command (ACC)
 Mission and Installation Contracting Command (MICC) (JBSA-Fort Sam Houston)
 Field Directorate Office - Fort Sam Houston

United States Army South (USARSO)
 Headquarters US Army South (JBSA-Fort Sam Houston)
 512th Engineer Detachment

United States Army North (ARNORTH)
 Headquarters US Army North (JBSA-Fort Sam Houston)
 323rd US Army Band

United States Army Recruiting Command (USAREC)
 5th Recruiting Brigade
 Headquarters 5th Recruiting Brigade (JBSA-Fort Sam Houston)
 San Antonio Recruiting Battalion

United States Army Cyber Command (ARCYBER)
 United States Army Network Enterprise Technology Command (NETCOM)
 7th Signal Command
 Regional Network Enterprise Center - Southwest (JBSA-Fort Sam Houston)
 106th Signal Brigade (GSU) (JBSA-Fort Sam Houston)
 56th Signal Battalion

United States Army Intelligence and Security Command (INSCOM)
 470th Military Intelligence Brigade
 Headquarters 470th Military Intelligence Brigade (JBSA-Fort Sam Houston)
 470th Headquarters Company
 312th Military Intelligence Battalion
 717th Military Intelligence Battalion (JBSA-Lackland)

United States Army Civilian Human Resources Agency
 Fort Sam Houston Civilian Personnel Advisory Center (CPAC) (JBSA-Fort Sam Houston)

United States Army Reserve (USAR)
 Medical Readiness and Training Command
 Headquarters Medical Readiness and Training Command
 2nd Medical Training Brigade
 7304th Medical Training Support Battalion (GSU) (JBSA-Fort Sam Houston)
 3rd Medical Training Brigade
 7307th MES Battalion
 377th Theater Sustainment Command
 4th Expeditionary Sustainment Command (GSU) (JBSA-Fort Sam Houston)
 Headquarters 4th Expeditionary Sustainment Command
 1st Battalion
 355th Regiment Detachment 1 (JBSA-Camp Bullis)
 US Army Reserve Careers Group
 12th Battalion (JBSA-Camp Bullis) (GSU)
 6th Battalion
 95th Regiment (JBSA-Camp Bullis)
 699th Construction Management Team (JBSA-Camp Bullis)
 917th Engineer Facility Detachment (JBSA-Camp Bullis)
 US Army Reserve Operational Group
 Military Intelligence Readiness Command (MIRC)
 505th Military Intelligence Brigade (GSU) (JBSA-Camp-Bullis)
 505th Headquarters Company
 549th Military Intelligence Brigade
 Alpha Company
 Bravo Company

United States Army National Guard (ARNG)
 Texas Army National Guard
 236th Military Police Company (JBSA-Fort Sam Houston)
 71st Expeditionary Military Intelligence Brigade (JBSA-Fort Sam Houston)
 636th Military Intelligence Battalion (JBSA-Fort Sam Houston)
 Headquarters Company
 Bravo Company
 640th Military Intelligence Platoon
 Detachment 1 (GSU) (JBSA-Fort Sam Houston)
 Foreign Military Sales - Fort Sam Houston (JBSA-Fort Sam Houston)
 102nd General Support Battalion (JBSA-Fort Sam Houston)
 Headquarters Company
 Operations Support Company
 1st Battalion
 141st Infantry Regiment
 Delta Company (JBSA-Camp Bullis)
 536th Brigade Support Battalion
 Golf Company (GSU) (JBSA-Camp Bullis)
 162nd Area Support Medical Company (JBSA-Camp Bullis)
 111th Multi-functional Medical Battalion (JBSA-Camp Bullis)
 Texas Army National Guard Medical Detachment
 Detachment 3 (JBSA-Camp Bullis)
 Region 3 Recruiting and Retention Battalion
 Charlie Company (JBSA-Camp Bullis)
 197th Support Company (JBSA-Camp Bullis)
 1st Special Forces Battalion (JBSA-Camp Bullis)
 5th Special Forces Battalion (JBSA-Camp Bullis)
 119th Special Forces Group 
 1st Company (JBSA-Camp Bullis)

United States Navy 
Bureau of Medicine and Surgery (BUMED)
 Naval Medical Research Center
 Naval Medical Research Unit - San Antonio (GSU) (JBSA-Fort Sam Houston)

Naval Education and Training Command (NETC)
 Center for Security Forces (CENTSECFOR)
 Naval Technical Training Center Lackland (GSU) (JBSA-Lackland)

United States Navy Recruiting Command (NRC)
 Region West
 Navy Talent Acquisition Group San Antonio (GSU) (JBSA-Fort Sam Houston)

United States Navy Reserve (USNR)
 Navy Operations Support Center - San Antonio (JBSA-Fort Sam Houston)

United States Marine Corps 
United States Marine Corps Intelligence
 Marine Cryptologic Support Battalion (MCSB)
 Hotel Company (JBSA-Fort Sam Houston)

Marine Corps Reserves
 4th Marine Division
 4th Reconnaissance Battalion (GSU) (JBSA-Fort Sam Houston)
 H&S Company
 Charlie Company

US Department of Defense
Defense Health Agency (DHA)
 Medical Education and Training Campus (METC) (JBSA-Fort Sam Houston)

US Department of Homeland Security
Transportation Security Administration (TSA)
 TSA Canine Training Center

Former Bases
Brooks Air Force Base
Kelly Air Force Base

References

External links

 

Military facilities in Texas
Joint bases of the U.S. Department of Defense
Military in San Antonio
Military units and formations established in 2010
2010 establishments in Texas